Lejb (Leon) Wulman (September 13, 1887, Berdychiv – April 28, 1971, New York City) was a Polish-Jewish and American physician and social activist, the co-author (with Joseph Tenenbaum) of a monograph on the Polish-Jewish physicians murdered in the Holocaust (The Martyrdom of Jewish physicians in Poland).

He was son of Szama and Chana Wulman. He studied medicine at Warsaw University and qualified as a physician in 1916. In years 1916–1921 he lived and practised in Charkov; after 1921 he moved back to Warsaw. From 1921 to 1923 he served as deputy medical director of the Joint Distribution Committee for Poland. In 1923 he became a member and later director of TOZ (Jewish Health Organisation of Poland). In 1939 he managed to emigrate with his family to the United States.

He was a founder of the American Œuvre de secours aux enfants (OSE) Committee, and an executive director of this organisation since 1940.

Married with Esthera Szor, they had one daughter, Mary (Serafina) Wulman (born 1919). He died in New York in 1971.

Selected works
 Pięć lat działalności TOZu: 1922–1926. Warszawa: TOZ, 1927
 10 yor yidishe gezundshuts-arbet in Poyln: tsum 10-yorikn yubiley fun TOZ. Varshe: TOZ, 1933
 Na straży zdrowia ludu żydowskiego: 15 lat TOZ'u. Warszawa: TOZ, 1937
 In kamf farn gezunt fun yidishn folk. New York, 1968

References

19th-century Polish Jews
Physicians from New York City
1887 births
1971 deaths
20th-century Polish physicians
Jewish emigrants from Nazi Germany to the United States